Thoiry may refer to::

 Thoiry, Ain, a commune in the department of Ain, Auvergne-Rhône-Alpes region, France
 Thoiry, Savoie, a commune in the department of Savoie, Auvergne-Rhône-Alpes region, France
 Thoiry, Yvelines, a commune in the department of Yvelines, Île-de-France region, France